Al W. Wieser Jr. (born May 15, 1949) was an American politician and businessman.

Wieser lived in La Crescent, Minnesota with his family. Wieser went to the Houston County Public Schools. He graduated from Winona State University with a bachelor's degree in political science and economics. Wieser was an accountant and worked for Al's Concrete in La Crescent, Minnesota. Wieser served in the Minnesota House of Representatives from 1975 to 1983. Elected as a Democrat in 1974, he switched political parties and became a Republican in August 1977.

References

1949 births
Living people
American accountants
People from La Crescent, Minnesota
Businesspeople from Minnesota
Winona State University alumni
Minnesota Democrats
Minnesota Republicans
Members of the Minnesota House of Representatives